"Csárdás" (or "Czardas") is a rhapsodical concert piece by the Italian composer Vittorio Monti. Written in 1904, the well-known folkloric piece is based on a Hungarian csárdás. It was originally composed for violin, mandolin, or piano. There are arrangements for orchestra and for a number of solo instruments. "Csárdás" is about four-and-a-half minutes in duration.

Structure
The piece has seven different sections, usually of a different tempo (and, occasionally, key). The first half of the piece is in D minor; it modulates to D major, then back to D minor, and then finally finishes in D major.

The sections are as follows:

The tempo changes make the piece exciting and interesting, but even with all of these tempo changes, it is generally expected that there should be some rubato to add feeling to the piece. There are also many different dynamic changes in the piece, ranging from pianissimo to fortissimo. In the Meno, quasi lento section, the violin plays artificial harmonics. This involves the violinist placing their finger down on the note and playing another note, with the finger only just touching the string 5 semitones above. This gives the effect of the violin sounding two octaves (24 semitones) higher.

Published scores
Monti: Czardas per violino e pianoforte. Z. 13 700 (Editio Musica Budapest).
The Celebrated Czardas by V. Monti F 102595 F (G. Ricordi & Co., London Limited)

References

External links

 "Czardas" sheet music, kreusch-sheet-music.net

1904 compositions
Compositions by Vittorio Monti